John Baptist Ye Ronghua (19 June 1931 – 28 August 2022) was a Chinese Roman Catholic prelate.

Ye Ronghua was born in China and was ordained to the priesthood in 1981. He served as the bishop of the Apostolic Prefecture of Xing'anfu from 2000 until his death in 2022.

References

 

1931 births
2022 deaths
Chinese Roman Catholic bishops
20th-century Roman Catholic bishops in China
21st-century Roman Catholic bishops in China
Bishops appointed by Pope John Paul II
People from Hanzhong